The Consolidation of Enactments (Procedure) Act 1949 (12, 13 & 14 Geo 6 c 33) is an Act of the Parliament of the United Kingdom. It provides a procedure for including "minor corrections and improvements" in Consolidation Bills.

In 1995, Halsbury's Laws of England said that the procedure authorised by this Act was "no longer used in practice".

The Marriage Act 1949 was the first Act to be enacted under the Consolidation of Enactments (Procedure) Act 1949.

References
Halsbury's Statutes. Fourth Edition. 2008 Reissue. Volume 41. Page 756.

External links
The Consolidation of Enactments (Procedure) Act 1949, as amended from the National Archives.
The Consolidation of Enactments (Procedure) Act 1949, as originally enacted from the National Archives.

United Kingdom Acts of Parliament 1949
Constitution of the United Kingdom